María Angeles Fernandez Lebrato (born 12 September 1970 in Valladolid) is a vision impaired cyclist and B2/S12 swimmer from Spain.   She competed at the 1996 Summer Paralympics in swimming, winning a silver medal in the 200 meter individual medley and the 100 meter freestyle, and a bronze medal in the 50 meter freestyle race, 400 meter freestyle race and the 4 x 100 medley Relay 49 Points race. She competed at the 2000 Summer Paralympics in cycling.

References 

Living people
1970 births
Sportspeople from Valladolid
Cyclists from Castile and León
Spanish female freestyle swimmers
Spanish female medley swimmers
Spanish female cyclists
Paralympic bronze medalists for Spain
Paralympic silver medalists for Spain
Swimmers at the 1992 Summer Paralympics
Swimmers at the 1996 Summer Paralympics
Cyclists at the 2000 Summer Paralympics
Paralympic medalists in swimming
Medalists at the 1996 Summer Paralympics
Paralympic swimmers of Spain
Paralympic cyclists of Spain
S12-classified Paralympic swimmers